Polygonum is a genus of about 130 species of flowering plant in the buckwheat and knotweed family Polygonaceae. Common names include knotweed and knotgrass (though the common names may refer more broadly to plants from Polygonaceae). In the Middle English glossary of herbs Alphita ( 1400–1425), it was known as ars-smerte. There have been various opinions about how broadly the genus should be defined. For example, buckwheat (Fagopyrum esculentum) has sometimes been included in the genus as Polygonum fagopyrum. Former genera such as Polygonella have been subsumed into Polygonum; other genera have been split off.

The genus primarily grows in northern temperate regions. The species are very diverse, ranging from prostrate herbaceous annual plants to erect herbaceous perennial plants.

Polygonum species are occasionally eaten by humans, and are used as food plants by the larvae of some Lepidoptera species – see list. Most species are considered weeds in Europe and North America.

Description
When the genus is defined narrowly, Polygonum species are annual or perennial herbaceous plants, rarely shrubby, with much branched stems. They have a membranous ochrea (a sheath around the stem nodes). The flowers are usually bisexual, rarely unisexual, and have five (occasionally four) tepals, the outer being slightly different from the inner ones. There are usually four to six stamens and three (rarely two) styles. The fruit is three-sided.

Taxonomy
The genus Polygonum was first described by Carl Linnaeus in 1754. However, long before Linnaeus, the name was used in Greek and Latin for a plant used medically. 'fecund', 'with many offspring'. The Flora of North America says that a derivation meaning 'many seeds' is the "grammatically correct interpretation".

Many members of the family Polygonaceae that are now placed in separate genera were at one time or other placed in Polygonum, including species of Fagopyrum, Fallopia, Persicaria and Reynoutria, and older sources frequently use much wider definitions of the genus. Molecular phylogenetic studies, particularly in the 21st century, have led to major changes. Clarifying the circumscription of genera split from Polygonum was described in 2015 as "still ongoing".

Classification and phylogeny
Polygonum is placed in the tribe Polygoneae of the subfamily Polygonoideae. Within the tribe, it is most closely related to the genera Duma and Atraphaxis, forming the so-called "DAP clade".

Species

Between 65 and 300 species have been recognised at various times, depending on the circumscription of the genus. A number of species that had been included in Polygonum have been moved into several other genera, including Bistorta, Fagopyrum, Fallopia, Koenigia, Persicaria and Reynoutria. Other genera, such as Polygonella, have been subsumed into Polygonum.

, Plants of the World Online accepted 129 species.

Polygonum acerosum Ledeb. ex Meisn.
Polygonum acetosum M.Bieb.
Polygonum achoreum S.F.Blake
Polygonum adenopodum Sam.
Polygonum afromontanum Greenway
Polygonum agreste Sumnev.
Polygonum ajanense (Regel & Tiling) Grig.
Polygonum albanicum Jáv.
Polygonum amgense Michaleva & Perfiljeva
Polygonum arenarium Waldst. & Kit.
Polygonum arenastrum Boreau
Polygonum argyrocoleon Steud. ex Kunze
Polygonum articulatum L.
Polygonum austiniae Greene
Polygonum aviculare L.
Polygonum balansae Boiss.
Polygonum basiramia (Small) T.M.Schust. & Reveal
Polygonum bellardii All.
Polygonum biaristatum Aitch. & Hemsl.
Polygonum bidwelliae S.Watson
Polygonum bolanderi W.H.Brewer ex A.Gray
Polygonum boreale (Lange) Small
Polygonum bornmuelleri Litv.
Polygonum bowenkampii Phil.
Polygonum brasiliense K.Koch
Polygonum californicum Meisn.
Polygonum cascadense W.H.Baker
Polygonum caspicum Kom.
Polygonum ciliinode Michx. – fringed black bindweed, mountain bindweed
Polygonum cognatum Meisn.
Polygonum corrigioloides Jaub. & Spach
Polygonum deciduum Boiss. & Noë
Polygonum delopyrum T.M.Schust. & Reveal
Polygonum dentoceras T.M.Schust. & Reveal
Polygonum douglasii Greene
Polygonum effusum Meisn.
Polygonum engelmannii Greene
Polygonum equisetiforme Sm.
Polygonum erectum L.
Polygonum exsertum Small
Polygonum fibrilliferum Kom.
Polygonum fimbriatum Elliott
Polygonum floribundum Schltdl. ex Spreng.
Polygonum fowleri B.L.Rob.
Polygonum fragile Sumnev.
Polygonum glaucum Nutt.
Polygonum gussonei Tod.
Polygonum heterophyllum Sol. ex Meisn.
Polygonum heterosepalum M.Peck & Ownbey
Polygonum hickmanii H.R.Hinds & Rand.Morgan
Polygonum huananense A.J.Li
Polygonum humifusum C.Merck ex K.Koch
Polygonum icaricum Rech.f.
Polygonum idaeum Hayek
Polygonum imberbe Sol. ex G.Forst.
Polygonum inflexum Kom.
Polygonum istanbulicum M.Keskin
Polygonum jaxarticum Sumnev.
Polygonum korotkovae Sumnev.
Polygonum kudriaschevii Vassilkovsk.
Polygonum lacerum Kunth
Polygonum liaotungense Kitag.
Polygonum longiocreatum Bartlett
Polygonum longipes Halácsy & Charrel
Polygonum majus (Meisn.) Piper
Polygonum marinense T.R.Mert. & P.H.Raven
Polygonum maritimum L.
Polygonum mezianum H.Gross
Polygonum minimum S.Watson
Polygonum molliiforme Boiss.
Polygonum myrtillifolium Kom.
Polygonum nesomii T.M.Schust. & Reveal
Polygonum nuttallii Small
Polygonum oxanum Kom.
Polygonum oxyspermum C.A.Mey. & Bunge
Polygonum palastinum Zohary
Polygonum papillosum Hartvig
Polygonum parksii (Cory) T.M.Schust. & Reveal
Polygonum paronychia Cham. & Schltdl.
Polygonum paronychioides C.A.Mey.
Polygonum parryi Greene
Polygonum patulum M.Bieb.
Polygonum peruvianum Meisn.
Polygonum pinicola T.M.Schust. & Reveal
Polygonum plebeium R.Br.
Polygonum polycnemoides Jaub. & Spach
Polygonum polygaloides Meisn.
Polygonum polygamum Vent.
Polygonum polyneuron Franch. & Sav.
Polygonum pringlei Small
Polygonum pulvinatum Kom.
Polygonum ramosissimum Michx.
Polygonum rectum (Chrtek) H.Scholz
Polygonum recumbens Royle ex Bab.
Polygonum rigidum Skvortsov
Polygonum romanum Jacq.
Polygonum rottboellioides Jaub. & Spach
Polygonum rupestre Kar. & Kir.
Polygonum rurivagum Jord. ex Boreau
Polygonum sabulosum Vorosch.
Polygonum salsugineum M.Bieb.
Polygonum sanguinaria Remy
Polygonum sawatchense Small
Polygonum schistosum Czukav.
Polygonum scoparium Req. ex Loisel.
Polygonum sericeum Pall.
Polygonum serotinum Raf.
Polygonum serpyllaceum Jaub. & Spach
Polygonum shastense W.H.Brewer ex A.Gray
Polygonum simlense Royle ex Bab.
Polygonum smallianum T.M.Schust. & Reveal
Polygonum spergulariiforme Meisn. ex Small
Polygonum striatulum B.L.Rob.
Polygonum stypticum Cham. & Schltdl.
Polygonum subaphyllum Sumnev.
Polygonum tenoreanum E.Nardi & Raffaelli
Polygonum tenue Michx.
Polygonum tenuissimum A.I.Baranov & Skvortsov ex Vorosch.
Polygonum thymifolium Jaub. & Spach
Polygonum tiflisiense Kom.
Polygonum tubulosum Boiss.
Polygonum turgidum Thuill.
Polygonum turkestanicum Sumnev.
Polygonum undulatum (L.) P.J.Bergius
Polygonum utahense Brenckle & Cottam
Polygonum valerii A.K.Skvortsov
Polygonum volchovense Tzvelev
Polygonum vvedenskyi Sumnev.
Polygonum zaravschanicum Zakirov

Reclassified species

Many species formerly placed in Polygonum have been moved to other genera in the subfamily Polygonoideae. Some synonyms are listed below.

Polygonum species that have been reclassified as Bistorta
Polygonum amplexicaule → Bistorta amplexicaulis
Polygonum bistorta – bistort → Bistorta officinalis
Polygonum bistortoides Pursh – American bistort, western bistort, smokeweed or mountain meadow knotweed → Bistorta bistortoides
Polygonum tenuicaule Bisset & S.Moore → Bistorta tenuicaulis
Polygonum viviparum – alpine bistort → Bistorta vivipara

Polygonum species that have been reclassified as Fagopyrum
Polygonum fagopyrum L. – buckwheat → Fagopyrum esculentum

Polygonum species that have been reclassified as Fallopia
Polygonum aubertii L.Henry → Fallopia aubertii
Polygonum baldschuanicum Regel – Russian vine → Fallopia baldschuanica
Polygonum convolvulus L. – black bindweed, wild buckwheat → Fallopia convolvulus
Polygonum dumetorum L. → Fallopia dumetorum
Polygonum scandens L. → Fallopia scandens

Polygonum species that have been reclassified as Koenigia
Polygonum alpinum → Koenigia alpina
Polygonum campanulatum – lesser knotweed, bellflower smartweed → Koenigia campanulata
Polygonum davisiae W.H. Brewer ex A. Gray and Polygonum newberryi Small → Koenigia davisiae
Polygonum molle → Koenigia mollis
Polygonum polystachyum Wall. ex Meisn. → Koenigia polystachya

Polygonum species that have been reclassified as Persicaria

Polygonum alatum → Persicaria nepalensis
Polygonum amphibium – amphibious bistort, longroot smartweed, water smartweed → Persicaria amphibia
Polygonum capitatum – pinkhead smartweed → Persicaria capitata
Polygonum chinense L. → Persicaria chinensis
Polygonum coccineum Muhl. ex Willd. → Persicaria amphibia
Polygonum filiforme Thunb. → Persicaria filiformis
Polygonum hydropiper – water-pepper → Persicaria hydropiper
Polygonum hydropiperoides Michx. – swamp smartweed → Persicaria hydropiperoides
Polygonum lapathifolium – pale persicaria or nodding smartweed → Persicaria lapathifolia
Polygonum longisetum → Persicaria longiseta
Polygonum minus – small water-pepper → Persicaria minor
Polygonum mite Schrank – tasteless water-pepper → Persicaria mitis (Schrank) Assenov
Polygonum nepalense → Persicaria nepalensis
Polygonum odoratum Lour. – Vietnamese coriander → Persicaria odorata
Polygonum orientale → Persicaria orientalis
Polygonum pensylvanicum – Pennsylvania smartweed or pink knotweed or pinkweed → Persicaria pensylvanica
Polygonum perfoliata – Asiatic Tearthumb → Persicaria perfoliata
Polygonum persicaria – redshank or persicaria or lady's thumb → Persicaria maculosa
Polygonum praetermissum → Persicaria praetermissa
Polygonum punctatum Elliott – dotted smartweed → Persicaria punctata
Polygonum runcinatum → Persicaria runcinata
Polygonum sagittatum – arrowleaf tearthumb, American tear-thumb or scratchgrass → Persicaria sagittata
Polygonum tinctorium → Persicaria tinctoria
Polygonum virginianum L. → Persicaria virginiana

Polygonum species that have been reclassified as Reynoutria
Polygonum multiflorum Thunb. → Reynoutria multiflora
Polygonum cuspidatum Siebold & Zucc. – Japanese knotweed → Reynoutria japonica
Polygonum sachalinense F.Schmidt – giant knotweed → Reynoutria sachalinensis

Unresolved species

Polygonum vaccinifolium Wall. is an unresolved species name. Persicaria vaccinifolia may be a synonym.

Uses 

Several species can be eaten cooked, for example during famines. The species Polygonum cognatum, known locally as "madimak", is regularly consumed in central parts of Turkey.

References in literature

In The Man Who Laughs Victor Hugo wrote of the Comprachicos (child-buyers) who created artificial dwarfs, formed "by anointing babies' spines with the grease of bats, moles and dormice" and using drugs such as "dwarf elder, knotgrass, and daisy juice". The idea of such use was also known to Shakespeare, as Beatrice K. Otto pointed out, quoting A Midsummer Night's Dream:Get you gone, dwarf;You minimus, of hindering knot-grass made;

References

External links

Natural History Museum, London: Nature-navigator website
Royal Horticultural Society: Plant Finder section website
Flora of Northern Ireland

 
Polygonaceae genera
Taxa named by Carl Linnaeus